Carvol may refer to:
 Carvone, a member of a family of chemicals called terpenoids
 Carvedilol, a medication used to treat high blood pressure